Janikowo is a town in Inowrocław County, Kuyavian-Pomeranian Voivodeship (north-central Poland).

Janikowo may also refer to the following places in Poland:
Janikowo, Gmina Kruszwica in Kuyavian-Pomeranian Voivodeship
Janikowo, Greater Poland Voivodeship (west-central Poland), partly within the city of Poznań
Janikowo, Masovian Voivodeship (east-central Poland)
Janikowo, Warmian-Masurian Voivodeship (north Poland)